Zhitnitsa may refer to the following villages of Bulgaria:

Zhitnitsa, Dobrich Province
Zhitnitsa, Kardzhali Province
Zhitnitsa, Plovdiv Province
, in Provadia Municipality